Tatkavaklı  (former Kavaklı) is a town in Bursa Province,  Turkey.

Geography 

Tatkavaklı is in Mustafakemalpaşa district of Bursa Province. At  it is on Turkish state road  which connects Bursa to İzmir. The population of the town was 3550 as of 2012.

History
The settlement was founded by a group of families migrated from Kangal (Sivas Province, east of Central Anatolia) in the early 16th century. The first building of the settlement was a mosque commissioned by Sipahi Kapucu a tımarlı sipahi (fief holder) of the Ottoman Empire in 1505. The earlier name of the settlement was Kavaklı ("with poplar") . But in 1973 when the settlement was declared a seat of township, the prefix Tat was added referring to a factory around.

Economy
The economy of the town depends on agriculture. There is a tomato paste factory and a dairy products factory around the town.

References  

Populated places in Bursa Province
Towns in Turkey
Mustafakemalpaşa